Tennis has been a part of the Summer Universiade program since the games' first edition in 1959, with the exception of the  1975 Summer Universiade and again in 1989. The first change at the program was at the 1987 edition, when FISU decided awards two bronze medals for the losers of the semifinals, extinguishing the fourth place. The second change was in 2009, when the team competitions  were included. Currently, seven events are played at Universiade. Individual, double and team contests for men and women, as well as mixed doubles.

Past medalists include twice Grand Slam (2011 French Open, 2014 Australian Open) women's singles champion Li Na, 1978 French Open champion Virginia Ruzici, Grand Slam men's singles runner-up Nikola Pilić; doubles champions Fred McNair, Olga Morozova, Larisa Savchenko, Tomáš Šmíd, and Ion Țiriac; mixed doubles champion Rika Hiraki; 1984 Olympic runner-up Sabrina Goleš, 1992 Olympic bronze medalist, 1992 Olympic bronze medalist Leila Meskhi, and 2004 Olympic doubles gold medalist Li Ting.

Results

Men's singles

Men's doubles

Men's team

Women's singles

Women's doubles

Women's team

Mixed doubles

Medal table 
Last updated after the 2019 Summer Universiade

External links 
 World University Games Tennis on HickokSports.com
 Universiade on Sports123.com

 
Tennis
Universiade